The Presbyterian Church in Korea (GaeHyuk) united with part of the HapdongBoShu, but one part remain independent under the leadership of Kim Myung-Hyuk. The GaeHyuk had 84,000 members and 433 congregations in 16 Presbyteries, and a General assembly. It affirms the Apostles Creed and the Westminster Confession.

References 

Presbyterian denominations in South Korea